Benjamin Howe (born 1977 in London, England) is a contemporary Australian artist is known primarily for his figurative and experimental oil painting.  He holds a Masters of fine art degree with distinction from RMIT University.

Howe is known for his scientific-surrealist imagery that is both hyper-realistic yet reductive.  His works have been referred to as ‘isolated or lonely’ and regularly feature a muted or monochromatic palette.  Howe's paintings are often derived from preliminary explorations in other media such as sculpture, photography, and film.  His works frequently examine ideas relating to inconsistencies of memory, personal history and the nature of consciousness.  Howe's artwork has been exhibited worldwide.  He has had 19 solo exhibitions, including 2 retrospectives, and his work has been included in more than 50 group shows.

In 2019, Howe was a finalist in the Doug Moran National Portrait Prize, and the Lester Prize. He has also been a finalist in the Black Swan Prize (2016), and the Metro 5 Award, (2012+2011).  In 2017, he won the Hill Smith Prize at NotFair.
He has been the recipient of residencies and fellowships including the Ucross Foundation,  USA (2015), Shangyuan Art Museum, China (2014), and SKAM, Germany (2007).

Howe's paintings have been featured as cover art on several music releases (including ‘Graded’ by Cirex), book covers and reproduced in magazines and journals including Hi Fructose, Beautiful Bizarre, Selected Contemporary Artists of Australia, Double Dialogues and Out of Step Books.  In 2019, his paintings were used in a new publication of Moby Dick, celebrating Herman Melville’s 200th anniversary.

Works

"Crowds",  2009 - present 
Howe created a series of miniature sculptures to simulate the idea and feeling of an assembly, without any attachment to an actual event.  The dioramas were photographed and rendered in paint, using a technique that appears photographic from a distance, yet becomes more abstracted and painterly with proximity. 
Repetition, miniaturisation, and fluctuations between representation and abstraction were used to activate links between the body, movement and memory.

"Within the Grey", 2014 - 2015
This series reflects a more interior examination of the human psyche, and a counterbalance to Howe's work with crowds. It depicts the peculiar association of subject to physical space. The paintings document and explore the semi-conscious adaptation to new environments experienced by temporary residents; examining how people move into a space and start to inhabit it. Embracing a synthesis of both external and internal realities, the works interweave themes of dislocation, habitation and the subliminal response of the psyche towards the unknown. 
Howe's use of expressive brushwork, sharp contrasts and spatial distortions illuminate or add information while symbolic elements, informed by the subjects activity, or the artists own reaction to the space, further disrupt the illusion of sheer figurative representation.

"Surface Variations", 2002 - present
Through a process of creating sculptures that reference aspects of the body and then subjecting the clay forms to dislocation and realignment, Howe reconfigure the Marquette to form new compositions and meanings.  Cut, broken, compacted and rearranged, they are often unrecognizable in the finished paintings, which are contemplation on the fractured and subjective nature of memory, and the effect it has on the construction of identity.  He is known to destroy the sculptures and reuse the same block of clay for every piece.

"City", 2010 - 2013
These paintings address movement within the metropolitan environment, informed by research relating to the examination of aggregate behavior over various duration and viewpoints. Howe attempts to compress this information into single images by building overlapping layers of paint based on video footage and sequential photographs. The paintings are an attempt to show how collective elements reveal potential form over time; the individual and the city part of an integrated whole. 
Using the constraints and unique material attributes of paint including layering, color, texture and fluctuating levels of focus, Howe explores conflicting ideas of symbiosis, dislocation and placelessnes within contemporary life and the metropolitan crowd.

Solo exhibitions 

2019		Leviathan, Beinart Gallery, Melbourne, Australia 
2018		A Strange Architecture, Hill Smith Gallery, Adelaide, Australia
2017		Weave, Beinart Gallery, Melbourne, Australia
2017		Selection, Mycelium, Melbourne 
2016		Themes of Dislocation and Habitation, St Francis, Melbourne
2015		Monochromatic Anomalies, Lorimer Gallery, Melbourne, Australia
2014 		Within the Grey, Shangyuan Museum of Modern Art, Beijing, China
2013		The Sum of its Parts, Metro Gallery, Melbourne
2012		Signs, Manyung Gallery, Melbourne
2011		Exploring Transience: locating meaning within the urban crowd. First Site Gallery, Melbourne
2010 		Schism Overwrite, As Soon As Gallery, Hamburg	
2009		Graffscapes, Manyung Gallery, Melbourne	
2008		Urban Fractures 2, 5-502, Sydney		
2007		Once Upon a Space, Brunswick Street Gallery, Melbourne	
2007		Raumatisiert, Wir sind Woanders, European art festival, Hamburg	 
2007		Urban Fractures, SKAMraum, Hamburg	
2006		Surface Variations, Brunswick Street Gallery, Melbourne	
2004		Forms and shadows, Manyung Gallery, Melbourne	
2003		Selected works, Manyung Gallery, Melbourne

Group exhibitions 

2020		Dark Art, Beinart Gallery, Melbourne
2020		Antipodes, Beinart Gallery, Melbourne
2019		Doug Moran National Portrait Prize, Sydney 
2019		Lester Prize, Art Gallery of WA, Perth Cultural Centre, WA.
2019		Dark Art, Beinart Gallery, Melbourne
2018		Australian Art, Beinart Gallery, Melbourne
2018		Ephemeral, Modern Eden Gallery, San Francisco, USA
2018		Focal Point: New Realist Painting. Hill Smith Gallery, Adelaide
2018		Dark Art Show, Beinart Gallery, Melbourne
2018		Bluethumb Award, Melbourne
2017		NotFair 2017, Melbourne
2017		The 13th Hour, Last Rites Gallery, New York, USA
2017		If Our days won't Last, Distinction Gallery, Escondido, CA, USA
2017		Art collecter starter kit, Corey Helford Gallery, Los Angeles, USAv
2016		Metro Summer Show 2016, Melbourne	
2016		Beinart Small Works 2016, Melbourne
2016		Metropolis, Manyung Gallery, Melbourne
2016		Transmogrify, Beinart Gallery, Melbourne
2016		Black Swan prize, Art Gallery of WA, WA.
2016		Beinart Inaugural Exhibition, Beinart Gallery, Melbourne
2015		Whyalla art prize exhibition, Adelaide Festival Centre, Adelaide
2014		Shangyuan Resident Artists 2014
2014		Ben Howe and HaHa – Second Story Studio, Melbournev
2014		Strange Attractor, D11 Docklands
2013		Supporters Exhibition, D11 Docklands
2013		Urban, Manyung Gallery, Melbourne
2013	        Your Old Self, Tinning Street Gallery, Melbourne
2012		Exploration 12. Flinders Land Gallery, Melbourne
2012 		Melbourne Art fair, Exhibition Building, Melbourne
2012		Matter and Space. Ne Na Contemporary Art Space, Chiang Mai, Thailand
2012		Possibilities, Metro Gallery, Melbourne 
2012		Dark Horse. The Dark Horse Experiment, Melbourne
2012		It's Not You, It's Me, Eckersley's Open Space Gallery, Melbourne
2012		Climate Change. Metro Gallery, Melbourne
2011		RMIT Master of Fine Art Graduate Exhibition. Gossard Project Space, Melbourne
2011		The Brunswick Show, Donkey Wheel House, Melbourne
2011		Space and the city, Eckersley's Open Space Gallery. Melbourne
2011		Surface: Texture, Materiality and Conceptual Plasticity, RMIT School of Art Gallery, Melbourne.
2010		SoBright, Prague, Melbourne
2010		New, Used and Abused, Loft Gallery, Melbourne
2010		The Brunswick Show, Donkey Wheel House, Melbourne	
2010		Irene's Street art festival, Irene, Melbourne
2010 		Out of Nowhere, 696 INK, Melbourne	
2010 		Grand Opening Show, 696 INK, Melbourne	
2010 		Urban Art 10A, Brunswick St Gallery, Melbourne	
2009 		Gaengeviertel, Hamburg
2009 		Melbourne stencil festival, Collingwood, Melbourne
2009 		Art Melbourne, Exhibition Building, Melbourne	
2009 		Painting 09A, Brunswick Street Gallery, Melbourne	
2007 		Stencil and Freeform Combinations, A.S.A, Hamburg
2007 		Art Melbourne, Exhibition Building, Melbourne BSG stand	
2003 		Selected Contemporary Artists of Australia, Manyung Gallery, Melbourne	
1997 		Contingency, RMIT Graduate Show, Span Galleries, Melbourne

References

External links 
 Ben Howe's Official Website
 Ben Howe's Gallery

Australian artists
Modern painters
Living people
1977 births